The Coburg Badge (Das Coburger Abzeichen) was the first badge recognised as a national award of the Nazi Party (NSDAP).

History
On 14 October 1922 Adolf Hitler led 800 members of the SA from Munich and other Bavarian cities by train to Coburg for a weekend rally. Once there, numerous pitched street battles with KPD communists occurred. In the end, the final victory belonged to the Nazis. Later, the day was known as the Deutscher Tag in Coburg (German Day in Coburg).

Award and status
Hitler ordered the Coburg Badge to be struck on 14 October 1932 to memorialise the event which took place ten years earlier, on Saturday, 14 October 1922, and to honour the participants. This was before Hitler came to power in January 1933. The badge was 40 mm wide and 54 mm high. It was made out of bronze and featured a sword placed tip downward across the face of a swastika within an oval wreath. At the top of the wreath was Coburg Castle and village. The wreath contains the words, MIT HITLER IN COBURG 1922-1932 (With Hitler in Coburg 1922–1932).

In November 1936, Hitler gave new "orders" for the "Orders and Awards" of the Third Reich. The top NSDAP awards are listed in this order: 1. Coburg Badge; 2. Nuremberg (Nürnberg) Party Badge of 1929; 3. SA Treffen at Brunswick 1931; 4. Golden Party Badge; 5. The Blood Order; followed by the Gau badges and the Golden HJ Badge.

On 1 August 1939, Reichsfuhrer-SS Heinrich Himmler decreed that any SS member (whether enlisted or officer) who wore the Coburg Badge was eligible to wear the Totenkopf ring. Since the Coburg Badge was not normally recorded in an NCO record dossier, the order required enlisted personnel to provide proof of their being awarded the Coburg Badge.

Notes

References 
 

 Gottlieb, Craig. The SS TOTENKOPF RING: An Illustrated History from Munich to Nuremberg. 

Orders, decorations, and medals of Nazi Germany